Manunui (Māori manu nui or "big bird") is a small Whanganui River settlement, about  east of Taumarunui on State Highway 4, in New Zealand's King Country. It was once known as Waimarino, but John Burnand of the Ellis and Burnand sawmilling firm renamed it Manunui around 1905.

Manunui is the home of the Ngāti Hinemihi and Ngāti Manunui hapū of the iwi Ngāti Tūwharetoa. Their Maniaiti Marae and Te Aroha o Ngā Mātua Tūpuna meeting house also have affiliations with the Ngāti Hāua hapū of Ngāti Hekeāwai and Ngāti Hāua, and with the Ngāti Tūwharetoa.

Another marae in the area, Matua Kore Marae and its Matua Kore meeting house, is affiliated with the Ngāti Hāua hapū of Ngāti Hāuaroa, Ngāti Hinewai and Ngāti Poutama.

Ellis and Burnand opened a sawmill in Manunui in 1901, specialising in milling kahikatea to make boxes of its odourless wood for the butter export industry. After the North Island Main Trunk Railway reached the settlement in 1903, the mill grew to be the largest in the region. It closed in 1942.

Manunui became a manufacturing and farming centre as the native forest around it was milled and cleared. At one point it was a town district (requiring a population of at least 500; the population was 515 in 1911), but merged back with Taumarunui county in the late 1970s; today is functionally a suburb of Taumarunui.

Education

See also
Manunui railway station
Ruapehu District

References

External links 
 Photo of logging train with picnic party, 1911

Populated places in Manawatū-Whanganui
Settlements on the Whanganui River